The 1966 Winter Universiade, the IV Winter Universiade, took place in Sestriere, Italy.

Medal table

References

1966
U
U
U
Multi-sport events in Italy
Sport in Piedmont
February 1966 sports events in Europe
Winter sports competitions in Italy